Yuri Igorevich (died December 21, 1237) also known as Yuriy Ingvarevich, was the Grand Prince of Ryazan (1235–1237) who presided over the Principality of Ryazan at the time of the Mongol invasion of Rus'.

According to The Tale of the Destruction of Ryazan, after receiving envoys of Batu Khan in December 1237, he sent his son Fedor to negotiate with Batu, but the envoys were massacred for their defiance, the first Russian martyrs of the Mongol invasion of Rus'.

After sacrificing his son in defense of his homeland, Prince Yuri led his army in the Battle of Voronezh River and finally perished during destruction of Ryazan.
He was succeeded by his nephew Ingvar Ingvarevich of Ryazan (1237–1252).

In popular culture 
He is a supporting character in the Russian historical fantasy film Furious (2017). He is played by Russian actor Aleksei Serebryakov.

References 

1237 deaths
Grand Princes of Ryazan
Eastern Orthodox monarchs
13th-century rulers in Europe